Irina Ivanovna Kirichenko (13 June 1937 – 11 March 2020) was a Soviet sprint cyclist who won two gold, four silver and one bronze medal at the UCI Track Cycling World Championships in 1962–1969. Between 1960 and 1969 she also won 10 national titles. After retirement from competitions she worked as a cycling coach in Kharkiv.

References

1937 births
2020 deaths
Ukrainian female cyclists
Soviet female cyclists
Sportspeople from Luhansk
UCI Track Cycling World Champions (women)
Ukrainian track cyclists